Rost van Tonningen is the name of a Dutch patrician family.

History
Founder of the family is notary Jacob Rost van Tonningen (1753–1826), who was born as the illegitimate son of the jeweler's daughter Maria Barbara van Tonningen (1717–1791) and the manservant Jacob Rost.

Family 
 Marinus Bernardus Rost van Tonningen (1852–1927), Dutch general
 Meinoud Rost van Tonningen (1894–1945), Dutch politician and Nazi collaborator
 Florentine Rost van Tonningen (1914–2007), Dutch national socialist and extreme-right activist, wife of Meinoud
 Floris Rost van Tonningen (born 1977), co-founder of the Dutch social networking site Hyves, grandson of Meinoud and Florentine.

Literature
Nederland's Patriciaat (1997) 80e jaargang, pages 306-324.

Dutch patrician families